Stanisław Bobak (12 March 1956 – 12 November 2010) was a Polish ski jumper.

Career
Bobak was born in Ząb. Stanisław Bobak was one of the leading ski jumpers of the 1970s and 1980s, and was a member of the Polish team at the 1976 Winter Olympics and 1980 Winter Olympics.  He died in Zakopane.

World Cup

Standings

Wins

References

External links

 Obszerna biografia i zdjęcia na Skoki Narciarskie Polska – Skijumping.pl (Polish)
 Sylwetka w portalu olimpijskim PKOl (Polish)

1956 births
2010 deaths
People from Tatra County
Polish male ski jumpers
Olympic ski jumpers of Poland
Ski jumpers at the 1976 Winter Olympics
Ski jumpers at the 1980 Winter Olympics
Sportspeople from Lesser Poland Voivodeship
20th-century Polish people